R.E.T.R.O. is a studio album by the futurepop band mind.in.a.box and released on 26 February 2010.

The album largely references the Commodore 64, including songs based on the music of some of the games for the platforms – Light Force, Last Ninja, Supremacy and The Last V8, as well as Shades, which is however not from a game but is a single C64 song.

"Mindkiller" is a modernized version of the "Parsec" (space shooter) intro music.

Track listing

References
http://www.stormingthebase.com/details.asp?ProdID=9417
http://www.mindinabox.com/sounds/main.php

2010 albums
Mind.in.a.box albums